Jean Bernard (13 August 1907 – 1 September 1994) was a Catholic priest from Luxembourg who was imprisoned from May 1941 to August 1942 in the Nazi concentration camp at Dachau. He was released for nine days in February 1942 and allowed to return to Luxembourg, an episode which he later wrote about in his memoirs of the camp and which was turned into a film.

Life
Born in 1907, the sixth of ten children, into the family of a Luxembourg businessman, he attended the Athénée de Luxembourg until 1925, then studied at the university of Louvain in Belgium and then studied theology and philosophy at the Catholic seminary in Luxembourg. He was awarded a doctorate in philosophy in 1933. From 1934, he headed the international Catholic film bureau (OCIC) in Brussels until it was closed down by the Gestapo in June 1940. He then became involved in helping Luxembourg families who had fled to France ahead of the German forces to return to their home country.

On 6 January 1941, he was arrested by the German occupation forces as a symbol of Luxembourg Catholic resistance to German occupation; that May he was sent to Dachau. In February 1942, he was unexpectedly released for nine days. He believed that this was part of a scheme to persuade six Luxembourgish priests to publicly voice their support for the Nazi regime. Bernard refused to cooperate, and was sent back to Dachau. Apparently, intervention by his brother with senior Nazi officials in Paris secured his definitive release on 5 August 1942.

Until September 1944, when Luxembourg was liberated, Bernard lived in a monastery.

After the war, he served as the editor of the Luxemburger Wort, held senior positions in the Catholic Church in Luxembourg, and received many awards. From 1945 to 1946 he described his experiences in a series of articles in the Wort, under the title Dachau. Aus dem Tagebuch eines Sträflings, and later in the book Pfarrerblock 25487. The book was the basis for Volker Schlöndorff's film The Ninth Day (Der neunte Tag), released in November 2004, about his nine-day release from Dachau.

From 1947 to 1970, Bernard was president of OCIC (which later became SIGNIS). In 1955 he was appointed honorary canon of the cathedral in Luxembourg. In 1958 he retired as editor due to health reasons, but continued to work at the newspaper. In 1970, Bernard was appointed an honorary prelate by Pope Paul VI. He was a member of the papal commission for film, radio and television; for the Second Vatican Council, he was a member of the working group on the press, film, radio and television, and was president of the Commission for the persecuted church, within the International Catholic Organisations Conference.

He died on 1 September 1994.

Honours
 Officer of the Order of the Oak Crown
 Knight of the Order of Merit
 Knight of the Order of Leopold (Belgium)
 Stella della Solidarietà

Works

Publications
 Pfarrerblock 25487. (Reprint) Luxembourg 2004. 
 Schneider, Deborah Lucas (English translation). Priestblock 25487: A Memoir of Dachau. 2007.

Filmography
 Mat Läif a Séil am Seminaire. (With Heart and Soul in the Seminary) 1932, 23 minutes.

References

Further reading
 Dostert, Paul. "Jean BERNARD 1907-1994". In: 400 Joer Kolléisch, Band II, p. 403-404. Luxembourg: Éditions Saint Paul, 2003. 
 Schmitt, Christoph : BERNARD, Jean. In: Biographisch-Bibliographisches Kirchenlexikon (BBKL). Band 28, Bautz, Nordhausen 2007, ISBN 978-3-88309-413-7, pp. 105–108

External links
  Krieps, Roger. Hut ab vor Mgr. Bernard!; Obituary in forum, No. 154, October 1994.
  Der Neunte Tag by Volker Schlöndorff

Luxembourgian Roman Catholic priests
Luxembourgian non-fiction writers
Luxembourgian journalists
Male journalists
Luxemburger Wort people
1907 births
1994 deaths
People from Luxembourg City
Luxembourgian people imprisoned abroad
Dachau concentration camp survivors
Luxembourg Resistance members
Alumni of the Athénée de Luxembourg
Luxembourgian people of World War II
20th-century Roman Catholic priests
20th-century journalists